The  is a railway line in the Tohoku Region of Japan, operated by East Japan Railway Company (JR East). It links Hachinohe Station in Hachinohe, Aomori with Kuji Station in Kuji, Iwate. The line stretches 64.9 km along the Pacific Ocean coast with a total of 25 stations.

Stations
Legend
◇, ∨, ∧ - Trains can pass each other at this station
｜ - Trains cannot pass

Rolling stock

New KiHa E130-500 series diesel multiple unit trains were introduced on the Hachinohe Line from 2 December 2017, displacing the ageing KiHa 40 series DMUs. All services on the line will be operated by KiHa E130-500 series DMUs from the start of the revised timetable on 17 March 2018.

The fleet consists of six two-car units and six single-car units.

History
In 1894, a spur line connecting Shiriuchi (now ) on the Tohoku Main Line with Hachinohe (now  was completed. This line was soon extended south to the now-defunct Minato Station. After the nationalization of the Nippon Railway in 1907, the spur line was renamed the Hachinohe Line in 1909. Freight operations were phased out at most stations between 1982 and 1986.

With the privatization of the Japanese National Railways (JNR) on April 1, 1987, the Hachinohe Line came under the control of the East Japan Railway Company (JR East), with remaining freight operations transferred to the Japan Freight Railway Company (JR Freight) at Hachinohe Freight Terminal.

2011 Tōhoku earthquake and tsunami
Services over the entire line resumed on March 17, 2012.

See also
 List of railway lines in Japan

References

External links

 JR East website 

 
Lines of East Japan Railway Company
Rail transport in Iwate Prefecture
Rail transport in Aomori Prefecture
1067 mm gauge railways in Japan
Railway lines opened in 1894